was a Japanese astronomer and discoverer of minor planets.

He is credited by the Minor Planet Center with the discovered 8 asteroids between 1927 and 1929.

The outer main-belt asteroid 2667 Oikawa was named in his memory. Naming citation was published on 1 June 1996.

References 
 

1896 births
1970 deaths
Discoverers of asteroids

20th-century Japanese astronomers